Jim Margolis is an American producer, writer, and director. He is best known for his work on The Daily Show and Veep. He is the showrunner and an executive producer of Patriot Act with Hasan Minhaj on Netflix.

Early life 
Margolis attended Wesleyan University in Connecticut until 1993.

Career 
Margolis worked at The Daily Show from 2001 to 2012. He was hired first as a Field Producer and became Co-Executive Producer, going on to win 6 Emmy's. Margolis has also worked on Newsreaders on Adult Swim as Showrunner, writer, director, Blunt Talk on Starz as a writer, and Veep as a writer and Co-Executive Producer, where he won an Emmy and Writer's Guild Award.

Prior to his career as a comedy writer, Margolis worked for PBS Frontline where he won a new Emmy and as an associate producer at CBS News "60 Minutes".

Personal life 
Margolis was born in Cleveland, Ohio. He is married to novelist Leslie Margolis, has two children and lives in Los Angeles.

References 

Year of birth missing (living people)
Living people
Showrunners
Television producers from Ohio
American television writers
American television directors
Writers from Cleveland
60 Minutes producers